The Church of Iceland, officially the Evangelical Lutheran Church of Iceland, is the national church of Iceland. The church is Christian and professes the Lutheran faith. It is a member of the Lutheran World Federation, the Porvoo Communion, the Communion of Protestant Churches in Europe, and the World Council of Churches.

The church is organised as a single diocese headed by the Bishop of Iceland. The current bishop is Agnes M. Sigurðardóttir, the first woman to hold this position. The church also has two suffragan sees, Skálholt and Hólar, whose bishops are suffragans or assistant bishops to the Bishop of Iceland; unusually, each has a cathedral church despite not being in a separate diocese.

History

Pre-Christian era and the adoption of Christianity

Christianity was present from the beginning of human habitation in Iceland. The first people setting foot on Icelandic soil were Chalcedonian Irish hermits (see Papar), seeking refuge on these remote shores to worship Christ. Later, Norse settlers are thought to have driven them out. Some of the settlers were Christians, although the majority were pagan, worshipping the old Norse gods. When the Alþingi was first convened in 930 CE, it was based upon Norse paganism. In the late 10th century, missionaries from the continent sought to spread Catholicism (pre-Great Schism) among the population.

Ari Þorgilsson, in his historical work Íslendingabók, recounts that the society was deeply divided between the adherents of the different religions that would not tolerate each other. At the Alþingi in Þingvellir, in the year 1000, the Icelandic Commonwealth was on the brink of civil war. The different leaders realized the danger and found a solution. They chose a person that everybody respected for his wisdom, the heathen priest and chieftain, Þorgeir of Ljósavatn, to decide which way the people should go. Þorgeir retired to his dwelling and lay there all day meditating with a cloak covering his face so that nobody would disturb him. The next day he called the assembly together and made his decision known. "If we put asunder the law, we will put asunder the peace," he said. "Let it be the foundation of our law that everyone in this land shall be Christian and believe in one God, Father, Son and Holy Spirit." His conversion decree included three pagan practices that would be tolerated and only practiced in private. These practices were pagan sacrifices, the exposure of infants, and the eating of horse flesh. The people agreed and many were subsequently baptized in the waters of Vígðalaug hot springs. Once Þorgeir was baptized he returned to his farm in Ljósavatn, gathered the images of his gods, and threw them into a waterfall to show his commitment to the new law.

Before Reformation
At the inauguration of Christianity in Iceland, missionary bishops and priests from Germany, England, and Eastern Europe worked among the population. The first Icelandic bishop, Ísleifur Gissurarson, was consecrated in Bremen in 1056, and he made Skálholt the episcopal see. Thereafter, Skálholt was the centre of Christian learning and spirituality in the country through the 18th century.
In spite of all the upheavals of history there is a marked continuity within the church of Iceland. For the first five centuries, the Icelandic church was Roman Catholic. In the beginning of 1056, it was part of the province in Bremen. Later, the Icelandic church came under the archbishops of Lund and in 1153 it became a part of the province of Nidaros. Iceland was divided into two dioceses, Skálholt, established 1056, and Holar in 1106. These continued until 1801, when Iceland became one diocese under one bishop of Iceland, residing in Reykjavík.

The country was an independent republic from 930 until 1262. Then Iceland, having suffered civil war and anarchy, came under the rule of the Norwegian Realm and in 1380 with Norway under the Danish crown. In 1944 Iceland regained its independence as a republic.

Three Icelandic churchmen were revered as saints, even though none of them was actually canonized. The most famous of them is Saint Thorlak (Þorlákur Þórhallsson) of Skálholt (1133–1193). He was educated in Lincoln, England, and in Paris, France. Returning to Iceland, Þorlákur became an abbot of the Canon Regular monastery of Þykkvibær, soon gaining a reputation for his sanctity. As a bishop of Skálholt, he sought to enforce the decrees of Rome regarding the ownership of church property and morality of the clergy. The Icelandic calendar has two days dedicated to Þorlákur, 20 July and 23 December. The other two saintly bishops are Jón Ögmundsson (1106–1121) and Guðmundur Arason (1203–1237).

There was great literary activity during the 12th and 13th centuries, producing extensive religious literature as well as romantic novels and sitcoms in the Icelandic language as well as the well-known sagas. Clergy doubtless wrote most of them. Parts of the Bible were already translated into Icelandic in the 13th century. This powerful and enduring literary tradition with its strong national character has shaped the Icelandic language and inspired literary activity. Icelandic has had a continuity that makes it the oldest living language in Europe. The Icelandic hymnal contains hymns from the 12th century and the 14th centuries in their original linguistic forms.

Reformation
In 1540, the Lutheran Reformation was established in Iceland, enforced by the Danish crown. The monasteries were dissolved and much of the property of the episcopal sees confiscated by the King of Denmark, who became the supreme head of the church. A dark spot in the history of the Reformation is the lawless execution in 1550 of the last Roman Catholic bishop of Hólar, Jón Arason, and his two sons. Most of the Roman priests continued in their parishes under the Lutheran church ordinance. The Reformation unleashed renewed literary activity in the country. The publication of the Icelandic translation of the New Testament in 1540 and the entire Bible in 1584, marks important milestones in the history of the Icelandic language and is a major factor in its preservation. The "Hymns of the Passion", 50 meditations on the cross by the 17th century poet and minister Hallgrímur Pétursson (1614–1674), were for generations the most important school of prayer and wisdom. The same can be said of "The Postil", the sermons of Jón Vídalin, Bishop of Skálholt (1698–1720). His eloquent and dynamic sermons were read in every home for generations.

The Icelandic Bible Society was founded in 1815. Its foundation was the fruit of the visit of a Scottish minister, Ebenezer Henderson, who travelled around the country distributing Bibles and New Testaments.

The 19th century witnessed the beginning of a national revival in Iceland and a movement towards political independence. Many clergy played an important part in that movement.

Modern era
The constitution of 1874 guarantees religious freedom, but the constitution also specifies that the "Evangelical Lutheran Church is a national church and as such it is protected and supported by the State." This provision was retained in the constitution of the Republic of Iceland of 1944. Around the start of the 20th century, the church legislation was reformed, parish councils were established and the congregations gained the right to elect their pastors. A new translation of the Bible was printed in 1912, and revised in 1981. The most recent translation of the Bible was published in 2007 by the Icelandic Bible Society. In the early 20th century, liberal theology was introduced in Iceland, causing great theological strife between liberal and conservative adherents. Textual criticism of the Scriptures and radical theological liberalism was quite influential in the Department of Theology within the newly founded University of Iceland. Spiritism and theosophical writings were also influential in intellectual circles. Opposed to this were the inner mission, the YMCA/YWCA, and missionary societies with a pietistic leadership. This conflict marred church life in the country well into the 1960s.
At the start of the 20th century, two Lutheran free churches were founded, based on the same confessions as the national church and using the same liturgy and hymnal, but structurally and financially independent. Earlier, Roman Catholic priests and nuns had established missions and founded hospitals. In the early decades of the 20th century Seventh Day Adventist and Pentecostal missions were quite successful.

Until the 20th century, most Icelanders were rural farmers and fishermen who enjoyed a traditional lifestyle. The church was a part of this way of life, with prayers and devotions in every home and everyday life influenced by religious customs. Modern social upheavals have brought with them problems for the church in Iceland. Iceland is a modern and highly urbanized society, highly secularized with increasing pluralism of belief.

About 62% of the population belong to the Evangelical Lutheran Church of Iceland and over 90% of the populace belong to Christian churches. Nine out of 10 children are baptised in their first year, more than 90% of adolescents are confirmed, 85% are married in the church and 99% of funerals take place in the church. Regular Sunday morning worshippers are a much lower percentage of the population, even though church festivals and special events frequently draw large crowds.

In 2000, the Icelandic people celebrated the millennium of Christianity in Iceland. In a 2004 Gallup poll of Icelanders, 51% of respondents described themselves as "religious". Ordination of women and blessing of same-sex marriages are allowed while allowing individual priests to not go against their conscience is discussed.

Organisation

Assembly and Council
On 1 January 1998, a new law came into effect defining the status of the Evangelical Lutheran Church of Iceland and its relations to the government. The annual Church Assembly (Kirkjuþing) is now the highest legislative authority of the church, making most church law previously enacted by the Alþing. The Kirkjuþing has 29 elected representatives, 12 ordained and 17 lay-people, and a lay President.

The highest executive authority is the Church Council, Kirkjuráð, with two clergy and two lay-persons elected by the Kirkjuþing, and presided over by the Bishop of Iceland. The Bishop's Office in Church House in Reykjavík also serves as the office of the Kirkjuráð. Besides dealing with financial matters and personnel, it also has departments of education and diaconia, ecumenical affairs, church and society and communication. The church's publishing house is also situated in Church House.

Ministry and Synod
After the Reformation, the Icelandic church retained the two traditional dioceses of Skálholt and Hólar until 1801, when the sees were united into a single bishopric. The bishop of Iceland is based in Reykjavík, where the cathedral and bishop's office are located. New bishops were traditionally consecrated by Danish bishops until 1908 when, with growing demands for independence from Denmark, the outgoing bishop consecrated his own successor.

In 1909, two assistant or suffragan bishoprics (vígslubiskup) were created by reviving the old episcopal sees of Skálholt and Hólar. Although they are not diocesan bishops, they are responsible for the cathedrals of their sees and the building up of these as centres of study and spirituality. In 1990, new legislation was passed to give the suffragan bishops greater responsibility as assistants to the bishop of Iceland in pastoral matters and together the three bishops form the Bishops' Council.

Annually, the bishop summons all the pastors and theologians of the church to the Pastoral Synod, to discuss the affairs of the church and society. The synod has a say in all matters of theology and liturgy to be decided by the bishop and Kirkjuþing. There are about 150 priests and 27 ordained deacons in the church. Fourteen priests work in non-parochial ministries in hospitals and other institutions. The Church of Iceland also has priests serving Icelandic congregations abroad.

Local parishes
There are about 300 Lutheran parishes nationwide. Each parish is a financially independent unit, responsible for the construction and upkeep of its church buildings and all the work of the congregation. Besides worship services, parish work covers wide range of educational and diaconal activities, children and youth work. In rural areas several parishes may be served by the same priest.

Theological education
The theological faculty of the University of Iceland, founded in 1911, educates the clergy (priests and deacons) for the Lutheran Church. Many theologians go abroad for further studies in seminaries and universities on both sides of the Atlantic. The Evangelical Lutheran Church of Iceland is far from being isolated and is open to all contemporary influences and theological trends.

Ecumenical alliances
The Evangelical Lutheran Church of Iceland is a member of the Lutheran World Federation, the World Council of Churches, the Conference of European Churches, and the Communion of Protestant Churches in Europe. In 1995 the church signed the Porvoo Communion Statement, entering into full communion (a close relationship with acknowledgement of shared doctrines and common ministries) with the Nordic and Baltic Lutheran churches and the Anglican Churches of the British Isles.

The Missionary Federation of Iceland in cooperation with the Norwegian Missionary Federation has operated missions in China, Ethiopia, and Kenya. The Icelandic Church Aid has worked in cooperation with international agencies in relief and development work in various parts of the world.

The church has historical connections with the other Nordic churches including the Church of Sweden, Church of Norway, Church of Finland, and its former parent church, the Church of Denmark. All Nordic state churches are of the Lutheran Christian tradition.

See also
Church of Denmark
Church of the Faroe Islands
Evangelical Lutheran Church of Finland
Church of Norway
Church of Sweden

References

Further reading
Hjalti Hugason. 2019. "Aðskilnaður ríkis og kirkju: Upphaf almennrar umræðu 1878–1915." Ritröð Guðfræðistofnunar 47/2018, bls. 44–71 44.

External links
Official website 
Official website 

 
Iceland
Iceland
Lutheranism in Iceland
Iceland
Iceland
Religious organizations established in the 1540s